Apterichtus kendalli, the Western Atlantic finless eel or finless eel, is an eel in the family Ophichthidae (worm/snake eels). It was described by Charles Henry Gilbert in 1891. It is a marine, subtropical eel which is known from the western and eastern Atlantic Ocean, including North Carolina, USA; the western Bahamas, Venezuela, and St. Helena Island.

Due to a lack of known major threats to the species, the IUCN redlist currently lists the Western Atlantic finless eel as Least Concern.

References

kendalli
Fauna of the Southeastern United States
Fish of the Caribbean
Fish described in 1891